Melanie Oudin and Jack Sock were the defending champions, but were defeated by Sania Mirza and Colin Fleming in the second round. 

Ekaterina Makarova and Bruno Soares won the title, defeating Květa Peschke and Marcin Matkowski in the final 6–7(8–10), 6–1, [12–10].

Kim Clijsters played her final professional match before her retirement later this year in this tournament, partnering Bob Bryan. The pair were defeated by Makarova and Soares in the second round. Clijsters would return to professional tennis in 2020.

Seeds

Draw

Final rounds

Top half

Bottom half

External links
 Main Draw
2012 US Open – Doubles draws and results at the International Tennis Federation

Mixed Doubles
US Open - Mixed Doubles
US Open - Mixed Doubles
US Open (tennis) by year – Mixed doubles